"The Twelve Gifts of Christmas" is a song parody written and performed by Allan Sherman based on the classic Christmas song "The Twelve Days of Christmas". The song reached #5 on the Billboard Christmas Chart in 1963. A noted jukebox record supplier stated that if the record was released earlier, it "might have been a hot number." The song subsequently appeared on Sherman's 1964 album, For Swingin' Livers Only! 
The song was arranged by Lou Busch.

He lists off the gifts in successive verses, and after some of them he adds more details about the first gift.

First day: A Japanese transistor radio.

Second day: Green polka-dot pajamas (The radio is a "Nakashuma", presumably the manufacturer.)

Third day: A calendar book with the name of his insurance man. (The radio is "the Mark 4 model, that's the one that's discontinued".)

Fourth day: A simulated alligator wallet. (The radio comes with a leatherette case with holes in it, so one could listen right through the case.)

Fifth day: A statue of a lady with a clock where her stomach ought to be. (The radio has a wire with a thing on one end, which one can stick into their ear, and a thing on the other end which one cannot stick anywhere, because it's bent.)

(NOTE: The original version stated the word "naked" before "lady", however, because of the risqué subject, Sherman was advised to drop the word "naked" for airplay and public release purposes.) 

Sixth day: A hammered aluminum nutcracker. ("And all that other stuff.") 

Seventh day: A pink satin pillow that says "San Diego", with fringe all around it, and all that other stuff. (Which is the last mention of earlier gifts until the last verse.)

Eighth day: An indoor plastic birdbath. 

Ninth day: A pair of Teakwood shower clogs.

Tenth day: A chromium combination manicure, scissors, and cigarette lighter.

Eleventh day: An automatic vegetable slicer that works when you see it on television, but not when you get it home.

Twelfth day: "Although it may seem strange, I'm going to exchange" all the gifts, which he then lists off. 

Sherman ends the song by saying "MERRY CHRISTMAS EVERYBODY".

References

Allan Sherman songs
Warner Records singles
Christmas novelty songs
American Christmas songs
1963 debut singles
1963 songs